Henry A. Moehlenpah was an American banker and politician who served as a member of the Federal Reserve Board of Governors from 1919 to 1920.

Biography
Moehlenpah was born to Frederick and Elizabeth Moehlenpah on March 9, 1867 in Joliet, Illinois. He married Alice Hartshorn in 1896 and was a Methodist. Moehlenpah died in 1949.

Education
Moehlenpah is  a graduate  of  Northwestern  University.

Career
Moehlenpah was a candidate for the United States House of Representatives from Wisconsin's 1st congressional district in 1906. He lost to incumbent Henry Allen Cooper. In 1908 he ran for Lieutenant Governor of Wisconsin, losing to William D. Connor. Moehlenpah later ran for Governor of Wisconsin in 1918, losing to incumbent Emanuel L. Philipp. He was a Democrat.

Henry A. Moehlenpah served as a member of the Federal Reserve Board from November 10, 1919, to August 9, 1920. Moehlenpah was nominated by President Woodrow Wilson on September 5, 1919, to fill the unexpired term of Mr. F. A.  Delano.  On  September 23,  the nomination was confirmed by the Senate.  He entered upon the career of banking in Joliet, Ill., in 1888, removing to Clinton, Wisconsin in 1893, where he engaged in the banking business.  At the time of his appointment he was president of  the Citizens Bank of Clinton, Wis., president of the Wisconsin Mortgage & Security Co. of Milwaukee, Wis., and director of the Rock County Savings & Mortgage Co.

References

External links
 Statements and Speeches of Henry A. Moehlenpah

1867 births
1944 deaths
20th-century Methodists
Methodists from Wisconsin
American political candidates
Federal Reserve System governors
People from Joliet, Illinois
Wisconsin Democrats
Woodrow Wilson administration personnel